Li'l Horrors is an Australian children's comedy puppetry television series which screened on the Seven Network in 2001. The series contained 52 episodes each 12 minute, 30 seconds in length, with double episodes usually screened in a 30-minute timeslot.

Plot
Li'l Horrors takes place in the home of horror actress Morbidda Bates. The series follows the adventures of little monster characters based on classic, fictional horror characters such as Count Dracula, Frankenstein's Monster, The Mummy, The Werewolf, Swamp Thing, Zombie, Quasimodo, Medusa and Gargoyles.

Characters
 Vladamir "Vlad" Bloode, a vampire based on Dracula from Bram Stoker's gothic horror novel of the same name. A notorious trickster around Maug Stone Hall, his favourite pastime is to pull practical jokes at the other Horrors' expense.
 Duncan Stein, based on Frankenstein's monster from the 1931 film Frankenstein. Gluttonous yet friendly, and yet also dim-witted and sorely lacking in social skills.
 Cleo Patra, an Egyptian mummy based on modern pop culture. Uses a lot of Valley Girl filler in her speech. Ironically her namesake was not a native-born Egyptian but a Greek immigrant.
 Webster Swampson, a piscine boy based on various sea monsters. School Brainiac and a bit of a nerd. Often turned to, to get the other Horrors out of a crisis. Storylines based around him involve some invention of his.
 Abercrombie Necros, a zombie who does little more than watch television. When the set is faulty, broken, or otherwise out of order, he often melts down, simply by repeating phrases often appearing on television sets without reliable signals. These meltdowns don't happen every time though.
 Medusilla Venimski, a pretty monster based on (and named for) the youngest of three gorgons, Medusa. Very vain as she often admires her beauty, which does not turn others (or herself) to stone, unlike the ugliness of her namesake. Her hair can talk as well, as evidenced in several episodes.
 Claudia Howell, a werewolf girl, who, unlike her mythological basis, appears to have no human form. Acts and communicates like a dog, for example, growling when angered or insulted. Sensitive to insults towards categories she falls within, and often the target of Vlad's trickery.
 Quasi Modo, a thorough spoof of Quasimodo from Victor Hugo's 1831 novel, the Hunchback of Notre Dame. Does not appear in every episode.
 Garg, one of two grotesques
 Goyle, Garg's permanent companion
 Bruce
 Ratso Risotto
 Humpfree
Morbidda Bates (known as "Miss Morbidda" to the Li'l Horrors), the owner of Maug Stone Hall. Unseen but referred to in most episodes. Her voice addresses the Horrors in the opening credits.

List of episodes 
 Monsters 'r Us by Brendan Luno
 Lolly Folly by Robert Greenberg
 Fangs for Your by Robert Greenberg
 Time Out ! by Brendan Luno
 Ghost of a Chance by Kevin Nemeth
 Ghoul Friends by Kevin Nemeth
 Rock Shock by Glen Dolman
 Trial and Terror by Glen Dolman
 I Want my Mummy by Jamie Forbes
 Were-with All by Beverley MacDonald
 Webster the Brave by Nancy Groll
 The Morbida Mystery by Nancy Groll
 Trouble Double by Clare Madsen
 The Coming of Quasi by Clare Madsen
 Stop and Gough by David Phillips
 Ice Scream by David Phillips
 The Cubby House War by Brendan Luno
 Beelzebubba by Brendan Luno
 Love Lettuce in the Sand (Which) by Jamie Forbes
 Play's the Thing by Hugh Stuckey
 Humpy Birthday to You by Anthony Watt
 Send in the Clones by Anthony Watt
 The Magic Hat by Glen Dolman
 The Treasure of the Scary Madre by Glen Dolman
 Comet Through the Wry by Adam Todd
 The Bleurgh with Project by Adam Todd
 Who Wants to Flea a Million Heirs by Anthony Watt
 The Spaceman Cometh by Anthony Watt
 Wouldn't it be Nice Revolting by Brendan Luno
 Mirror, Rirrom by Brendan Luno
 Now You See Me, Now You Don't by Glen Dolman
 The Good, the Bad and the Fluffy by Glen Dolman
 For whom the Bell Tolls by Annie Fox
 Mummy, Dearest by Annie Fox
 Revenge of the Zombie by Meg Mappin
 Vlad and Duncan's Excellent Adventure by Penelope Trevor
 Hall of the Mounted Things by Forbes
 Home Alone by Anthony Watt
 I Dream of Greenie by Anthony Watt
 Who Dares Wins by David Rapsey
 Under Your Spell by David Rapsey
 Follow the Black Asphalt Road by Anthony Watt
 Happily Ever Laughter by Anthony Watt
 Altered States by Brendan Luno
 Hamelot in Camelot by Brendan Luno
 Stinging in the Reign by Peter Hepworth
 I Won't, Dunce by Peter Hepworth
 Pants on Fire by Nancy Groll
 Head of the Class by Ray Boseley
 Speak No Evil by Chris Annastasiades
 The Wolf Who Cried Boy by Nancy Groll

Voices
 Paula Morrell
 Ric Herbert
 Rachel King
 Richard Hart
 Abbe Holmes
 Michael King
 Matthew King

International
The series also screened in the UK, Canada and France.

See also
List of Australian television series

References

External links
Li'l Horrors at December Media
Li'l Horrors at Australian Television Information Archive
Li'l Horrors at Screen Australia

Australian children's television series
Seven Network original programming
2001 Australian television series debuts
2001 Australian television series endings
Television shows set in Australia
Australian television shows featuring puppetry
Children's horror television series